Strock (otherwise Ströck) is a surname. Notable people with the surname include:
Albert Ströck (1903–71), Romanian-Hungarian soccer player
Carl A. Strock (born c. 1948), United States Army officer
Don Strock (born 1950), American football player and coach
George Strock, American photojournalist
Ian Randal Strock, founder of SFScope website
James Strock,  American entrepreneur, professional speaker and writer
Herbert L. Strock (1918–2005), American television producer and director and  film director